Falun is an unincorporated community in southwestern Saline County, Kansas, United States.  As of the 2020 census, the population of the community and nearby areas was 83.  It lies southwest of Salina and northwest of Lindsborg at the intersection of Forsse Road and Hedberg Road, about 7.5 miles west of Interstate 135 highway, or about 8 miles west of Assaria.  It lies next to an abandoned railroad.

History
The first post office in Falun was established in 1870.

It has a post office with the ZIP code 67442.

Geography
Its elevation is 1,348 feet (411 m), and it is located at  (38.6711171, -97.7594855).

Demographics

For statistical purposes, the United States Census Bureau has defined Falun as a census-designated place (CDP). Also, this community is a part of the Salina micropolitan area.

Education
The community is served by Smoky Valley USD 400 public school district.

Notable people
 U. Alexis Johnson (1908-1997), United States diplomat was born in Falun.

References

Further reading

External links

 Saline County maps: Current, Historic, KDOT

Census-designated places in Saline County, Kansas
Census-designated places in Kansas
Salina, Kansas micropolitan area
1870 establishments in Kansas
Populated places established in 1870